Sveti Križ (literally, 'Holy Cross' in Croatian and Slovene) may refer to several places:

In Austria:
Heiligenkreuz im Lafnitztal, also known as Sveti Križ in Slovene

In Croatia:
Sveti Križ, Budinščina, a village in the Municipality of Budinščina
Sveti Križ, Tuhelj, a village in the Municipality of Tuhelj
Sveti Križ, Mala Subotica, a village in the Municipality of Mala Subotica
Sveti Križ Začretje, a village and municipality

In Slovenia:
Beli Grič, a settlement in the Municipality of Mokronog–Trebelno, known as Sveti Križ until 1955
Brnica, Žalec, a settlement in the Municipality of Žalec, known as Sveti Križ until 1953
Gaj nad Mariborom, a settlement in the Municipality of Maribor, known as Sveti Križ until 1955
Križevska Vas, Dol pri Ljubljani, a settlement in the Municipality of Dol pri Ljubljani, known as Sveti Križ until 1952
Planina pod Golico, a settlement in the Municipality of Jesenice, known as Sveti Križ until 1955
Podbočje, a settlement in the Municipality of Krško, known as Sveti Križ pri Kostanjevici until 1952
Tlake, Grosuplje, a settlement in the Municipality of Grosuplje, where Zgornje Tlake was formerly known as Sveti Križ
Vipavski Križ, a settlement in the Municipality of Ajdovščina, known as Sveti Križ until 1955